Aleh Lukashevich (born March 27, 1972;) is a Belarusian journalist, television presenter, director and photographer.

Early life and education 
Aleh Lukashevich was born in the town of Lyachavičy, Belarus, on March 27, 1972. 

In 1995 he graduated from the Faculty of Journalism of the Belarusian State University. In 1996 he majored as a director and a TV cameraman at CIRNEA International Centre, Paris, France. 

In 1994 Lukashevich started work at Belarusian Television, where he created a number of TV projects: “New Collection”, “Our Heritage”, “Shot!”, “Epoch”.

Filmography 
 Boris Zaborov: The long road back. (Belarus, 52 min.) 2010
 Belarus-Born Artists of the School of Paris. (Bèlarus, 104 min.) 2011
 Marc Chagall. The colour of love. (Belarus, 26 min.) 2014
 Ossip Lubitch. Contemplator of life. (Belarus, 26 min.) 2014
 Ossip Zadkine. Interweaving of light and shadows. (Belarus, 26 min.) 2014
 Léon Bakst. The master of a line. (Belarus, 26 min.) 2014
 Chaïm Soutine. Desire for colour. (Belarus, 26 min.) 2014
 Nadia Khodasevich Léger. Prospection. (Belarus, 26 min.) 2014

Recognition and awards
Lukashevich is the first Belarusian journalist to have been accredited at the International Film Festivals in Cannes, Venice, and  Berlin.

Other awards and recognition include: 
In 2001, 2003 and 2008, Jerzy Giedroyc Honorary Diplomas for publicism in the field of culture
January 2005, prize of the President of the Republic of Belarus “For Spiritual Revival”
November 2005, chair of the Cinema Press Jury at the 12th Minsk International Film Festival
2005 - Francysk Skaryna Diploma
2001, 2003, 2008 - Jerzy Giedroyc Honorary Diplomas for publicism in the field of culture
 November 2006, at the 9th Eurasian TV Forum in Moscow, Diploma of the Winner and the Medal of Honour for the best documentary Epoch of Marc Chagall
Since November 2010, member of the Republican Public Council for Culture and Arts at the Council of Ministers of the Republic of Belarus
May 2011, head of the National Pavilion of the Republic of Belarus at the 64th International Cannes Film Festival
2016 - Prize of the Best Book Designer. Diploma of the Winner in the nomination "Best Designer" of the book with the presentation of a commemorative sign-symbol "Golden Folio" at the 55th National Competition "The Art of the Book - 2016" in Minsk

References 
 Famous TV host Oleg Lukashevich
 TV series about Belarusian artists broadcast on Lithuanian TV
 Alexander Alexeev and Oleg Lukashevich present new photographic album Heritage of Belarus
 W Narodowym Muzeum Historii Republiki Białoruś Aleksander Aleksiejew i Oleg Łukaszewicz przedstawili nową książkę-album
 Art exhibition by Oleg Lukashevich and Alexander Alekseev in Vienne
 On Cooperation Between Belarus and UNESCO
 In 2005, M. Oleg Lukashevich and M. Aliaksandr Alakseyeu collected some archives on Marc Chagall 
 Actress Fanny Ardant and journalists Alexandr Alexeev and Oleg Lukashevich
 Aleksander Aleksiejew i Oleg Łukaszewicz znajdują wspaniałe skarby i odkrywają niezbadane brzegi swojego kraju
 HISTORY OF THE ART PROJECT “HERITAGE OF BELARUS”
 Oleg Loukachevitch and his collaborators prepare a 26-minute documentary on Zarfin 
 "Heritage of Belarus: Treasures" continues the Heritage of Belarus publication series initiated in 2004
 Artists of the School of Paris Born in Belarus
 Spadchyna Belarusi : Skarby = Heritage of Belarus : Treasures
 The Artists of the School of Paris Born in Belarus 
 The exhibition features reproductions from the photo albums by Alexander Alekseyev and Oleg Lukashevich

1972 births
Living people
Belarusian journalists
Belarusian photographers
Belarusian State University alumni
Belarusian television presenters